Year 1385 (MCCCLXXXV) was a common year starting on Sunday (link will display the full calendar) of the Julian calendar.

Events 
 January–December 
 July 17 – Charles VI of France marries Isabeau of Bavaria; the wedding is celebrated with France's first court ball.
 August 6 – Edmund of Langley is elevated to become the first Duke of York in England.
 August 14
 Battle of Aljubarrota: John of Aviz defeats John I of Castile in the decisive battle of the 1383–85 Crisis in Portugal. John of Aviz is crowned King John I of Portugal, ending Queen Beatrice's rule, and Portugal's independence from the Kingdom of Castile is secured.
 The Union of Krewo establishes the Jagiellonian dynasty in Poland and Lithuania, through the proposed marriage of Queen regnant Jadwiga of Poland and Grand Duke Jogaila of Lithuania, and sees the acceptance of Roman Catholicism by the Lithuanian elite, and an end to the Greater Poland Civil War.
 August 31 – King Richard II of England begins an invasion of Scotland. The English burn Holyrood and Edinburgh, but return home without a decisive battle.
 September 18 – Battle of Savra: Serbian forces under Balša II and Ivaniš Mrnjavčević are defeated by Ottoman commander Hayreddin Pasha, near Berat.
 October 15 – Battle of Valverde: The armies of Portugal defeat Castile.
 December – A group of Hungarian nobles helps Charles III of Naples to overthrow Queen Mary, as ruler of Hungary and Croatia.

 Date unknown 
 Tokhtamysh of the Golden Horde conquers parts of the Jalayirid Sultanate in western Persia, causing a rift between himself and Timur of the Timurid Empire, who had also wanted to conquer Persia.
 Olav IV of Norway is elected as titular King of Sweden, in opposition to the unpopular King Albert.
 The Hongwu Emperor of China's Ming dynasty relents after eighteen tribute missions over the previous eight years, and agrees to invest King U of Goryeo.
 Construction of:
 Castello Estense in Ferrara (modern-day Italy)
 Bodiam Castle (East Sussex, England)

Births 
 June 23 – Stephen, Count Palatine of Simmern-Zweibrücken (d. 1459)
 August 1 – John FitzAlan, 13th Earl of Arundel, English noble (d. 1421)
 August 15 – Richard de Vere, 11th Earl of Oxford, English noble (d. 1417)
 date unknown
 Jean I, Duke of Alençon (d. 1415)
 Jan van Eyck, Flemish painter (approximate date; d. 1441)
 Margaret Holland, Duchess of Clarence, English noble (d. 1429)
 Mircea I of Wallachia (d. 1418)

Deaths 
 June 28 – Andronikos IV Palaiologos, co-ruler of the Byzantine Empire
 August 7 – Joan of Kent, Dowager Princess of Wales, widow of Edward, the Black Prince (b. 1328)
 September 18 – Balša II, ruler of Zeta
 October 15 – Dionysius I, Metropolitan of Moscow
 December 19 – Bernabò Visconti, Lord of Milan (b. 1319)
 date unknown
 Aluycia Gradenigo, Venetian patrician and dogaressa
 Xu Da, Chinese military leader (b. 1332)

References